The 2019–20 Saint Francis Red Flash men's basketball team represented Saint Francis University during the 2019–20 NCAA Division I men's basketball season. The Red Flash, led by eighth-year head coach Rob Krimmel, played their home games at the DeGol Arena in Loretto, Pennsylvania as members of the Northeast Conference. They finished the season 22–10, 13–5 in NEC play to finish in a share for second place. They defeated Bryant  and Sacred Heart to reach the championship game of the NEC tournament where they lost to Robert Morris. With 22 wins, they were a candidate for postseason play. However, all postseason tournaments were cancelled amid the COVID-19 pandemic.

Previous season
The Red Flash finished the 2018–19 season at 18–15, 12–6 in NEC play to finish in a tie for first place. Due to tiebreakers, they were the 1-seed in the 2019 Northeast Conference men's basketball tournament. The Red Flash defeated Bryant in the quarterfinals and LIU Brooklyn in the semifinals, yet lost in the championship game to Fairleigh Dickinson. As Regular Season co-champions they received an NIT bid. Saint Francis lost to 1-seed Indiana in the first round.

Roster

Schedule and results

|-
!colspan=9 style=| Non-conference regular season

|-
!colspan=9 style=| NEC regular season

|-
!colspan=9 style=| NEC tournament

References

Saint Francis Red Flash men's basketball seasons
Saint Francis (PA)
Saint Francis
Saint Francis